Hungary significantly decreased the manufacturing of buses but found a large assembly capacities of foreign brands (such as Mercedes-Benz, Suzuki, Audi, BMW, Skoda, SEAT, Volkswagen, Fiat, Ford, Chevrolet, Citroën, Peugeot, Renault and Opel) with annual production of more than 800 thousand cars.

History
Some original car production in the Hungarian part of Austro-Hungary at the beginning of the 20th century was lost.

Post World War II socialist Hungary widely imported cars and trucks from Soviet Union and other countries. At the same time Hungary produced small number of heavy trucks (Rába) and had strong specialization in Soviet block in manufacturing of buses (Ikarus), that made it one of the largest bus producers and exporters (including outside Soviet block and Europe). The Ganz Works, also a long lived Hungarian company, has been manufacturing engines, wagons specialized for electric railway equipment.

Active manufacturers

Audi Hungaria Zrt.

Csepel Holding

Csepel is a manufacturer of Electric Buses and EV Ready Series Hybrid buses.

Csepel Autógyár

Csepel is a manufacturer of trucks for industrial use.

Credo

Ikarus

Ikarus is a bus manufacturer based in Budapest. It was established in 1895 as Uhri Imre Kovács- és Kocsigyártó Üzeme (roughly: "Imre Uhri's Blacksmith Workshop and Coach Factory").

Magyar Suzuki

Magyar Suzuki Corporation is an automobile manufacturing plant, subsidiary of Suzuki, located in Esztergom and founded in 1991.

Mercedes-Benz Manufacturing Hungary

Rába

RÁBA Automotive Group,  commonly known as Rába, is a public limited company. It was founded in 1896 and produce military trucks, trucks, rail cars, trains, bridges steel structure.

Defunct manufacturers

Csonka

Fejes

Hódgép

Magomobil

MARTA

Alfabusz
Closed in April 2011

References

Hungary
Industry in Hungary